Abbs Valley is an unincorporated community and census-designated place (CDP) located in Tazewell County, Virginia. It was first listed as a CDP in the 2020 census with a population of 299.

Abb's Valley is named after Absalom Looney of Looney's Creek, considered the first white person to explore the area.

References

Unincorporated communities in Tazewell County, Virginia
Unincorporated communities in Virginia
Census-designated places in Tazewell County, Virginia
Census-designated places in Virginia